Pseudopostega pumila is a moth of the family Opostegidae. It was described by Walsingham, Lord Thomas de Grey, in 1914. It is known from Tabasco, Mexico.

The length of the forewings is about 3.2 mm. Adults have been recorded in March.

References

Opostegidae
Moths described in 1914